Mohmad Ajrudeen is an Indian cricketer. He made his List A debut for Himachal Pradesh in the 2018–19 Vijay Hazare Trophy on 30 September 2018.

References

External links
 

Year of birth missing (living people)
Living people
Indian cricketers
Himachal Pradesh cricketers
Place of birth missing (living people)